Laona Township may refer to the following townships in the United States:

 Laona Township, Roseau County, Minnesota
 Laona Township, Winnebago County, Illinois